Frenchtown Township is one of twenty-four townships in Antelope County, Nebraska, United States. The population was 159 at the 2010 census.

A large share of the early settlers being French people caused the name to be selected.

References

External links
City-Data.com

Townships in Antelope County, Nebraska
Townships in Nebraska